Riccardo Scalet is an Italian orienteering competitor and medalist in the Junior World Championships. He now lives in Transacqua.

In 2021, Scalet became one of the first Italian orienteers to receive a medal in a World Cup event. In the World Cup Finals, held in Cansiglio in northern Italy, Scalet came third behind Kasper Harlem Fosser and Matthias Kyburz.

See also
 Italian orienteers
 List of orienteers

References

External links
 
 

1996 births
Living people
Italian orienteers
Male orienteers
Foot orienteers
Junior World Orienteering Championships medalists